The Feast of the Holy Sovereigns is celebrated annually in the Episcopal Church in Hawaii on November 28.  The feast celebrates the founders of the Anglican Church of Hawaii, King Kamehameha IV and Queen Emma of Hawaii. The Anglican Church of Hawaii was originally called the Hawaii Reformed Catholic Church.

The rest of the Episcopal Church in the United States of America observes this as the feast day of Kamehameha and Emma, King and Queen of Hawaii, but does not use the name "Feast of the Holy Sovereigns".

References

Protestant holy days
November observances
Episcopal Church in Hawaii
Episcopal Church (United States)